Vincent Kok Tak-chiu (born 15 August 1965) is a Hong Kong actor, scriptwriter and film director.
Vincent's ancestral hometown is Shandong province. 

Kok is best known for his frequent collaborations with Stephen Chow, acting and co-writing with him the films Forbidden City Cop, From Beijing with Love and The God of Cookery in addition to producing and co-writing Chow's 2007 film CJ7. He also made a cameo appearance in Chow's Shaolin Soccer as a hapless soccer player.

Kok also wrote, directed and starred alongside Jackie Chan in Gorgeous, a romantic comedy by the martial arts actor.

Filmography
Love on Delivery (1994)
The God of Cookery (1996)
Troublesome Night 2 (1997)
Troublesome Night 3 (1998)
Shaolin Soccer (2001)
Marry a Rich Man (2002)
My Lucky Star (2003)
It's a Wonderful Life (2007)
Adventure of the King (2010)
Frozen (2010)
Echoes of the Rainbow (2010)
Fortune King Is Coming to Town (2010)
Love in a Puff (2010)
Mr. & Mrs. Incredible (2011)
Magic to Win (2011)
All's Well, Ends Well 2012 (2012)
Love in the Buff (2012)
Vulgaria (2012)
Love is... Pyjamas (2012)
Hotel Deluxe (2013)
Hello Babies (2014)
Overheard 3 (2014)
Full Strike (2015)
House of Wolves (2016)
All My Goddess (2017)
Two Wrongs Make a Right (2017)
Keep Calm and Be a Superstar (2018)
A Home with a View (2019)

References

External links

 Kok Tak-Chiu at Hong Kong Movie Database
 Vincent Kok Tak Chiu at HK Cinemagic

1965 births
Living people
Hong Kong male film actors
Hong Kong film directors
Simon Fraser University alumni
Hong Kong people of Shandong descent
20th-century Hong Kong male actors
21st-century Hong Kong male actors
Hong Kong male television actors